{{Taxobox
| name = Brucella pinnipedialis
| domain = Bacteria
| phylum = Pseudomonadota
| classis = Alphaproteobacteria
| ordo = Hyphomicrobiales
| familia = Brucellaceae
| genus = Brucella| species = B. pinnipedialis| binomial = Brucella pinnipedialis| species_authority = Foster et al. 2007 
}}Brucella pinnipedialis (heterotypic synonym "Brucella pinnipediae''" Cloeckaert et al. 2001) is a species of bacteria. It causes infections and related diseases primarily in pinnipeds and cetaceans.

References

Further reading

External links
LPSN

Type strain of Brucella pinnipedialis at BacDive -  the Bacterial Diversity Metadatabase

Hyphomicrobiales
Bacteria described in 2007